Ranemsletta is the administrative centre of the municipality of Overhalla in Trøndelag county, Norway.  The village is located on the north shore of the river Namsen, along the Norwegian County Road 17 which connects it to the town of Namsos and Grong.  The now-defunct Namsos Line railway used to run through the village as well.  The villages of Svalia and Skogmo are neighboring villages to the north and northeast.

The village has some industry, a cement factory, a high school, and the historic Ranem Church.

References

Villages in Trøndelag
Overhalla